Marion "Footsie" Woods was an American football player and coach. He served as the head football coach at the Charlotte Center of the University of North Carolina in 1947. Woods was drafted by the Pittsburgh Steelers in the 1946 NFL Draft.

References

Year of birth missing
Year of death missing
American football guards
Clemson Tigers football players
Charlotte 49ers football coaches